Tim Thelen (born June 14, 1961) is an American professional golfer.

Thelen was born in Albany, Minnesota. He played college golf at Foothills Junior College and Houston Baptist University where he was a teammate of Colin Montgomerie. He worked as a club professional winning the PGA Club Professional Championship in 2000 and 2003 and the 2009 PGA Assistant Professional Championship. He played in nine PGA Championships but failed to make the cut in any of them. He won the 2001 PGA Professional Player of the Year award.

After turning 50, Thelen won the European Senior Tour qualifying school in 2010. He finished 24th on the Tour's Order of Merit in 2011 and won his first Tour event at the 2012 Berenberg Bank Masters in Germany. He won his second event the following week at the Bad Ragaz PGA Seniors Open. He would win his third event on the tour later in the season, when he took the Fubon Senior Open in November. Thelen would win his fourth event on the European Senior Tour in September 2014, when he won the Senior Open de Portugal.

Professional wins (13)

Other wins (8)
2000 PGA Club Professional Championship
2001 Southern Texas PGA Championship
2003 PGA Club Professional Championship
2005 BP Trinidad Open
2006 BP Trinidad Open
2008 Southern Texas PGA Championship
2009 PGA Assistant Professional Championship, Southern Texas PGA Championship

European Senior Tour wins (5)

European Senior Tour playoff record (0–1)

Results in major championships

CUT = missed the half-way cut
Note: Thelen only played in the PGA Championship.

U.S. national team appearances
PGA Cup: 2000 (winners), 2003 (winners), 2005, 2007 (winners)

References

External links

American male golfers
Houston Christian Huskies men's golfers
European Senior Tour golfers
PGA Tour Champions golfers
Golfers from Minnesota
Golfers from Houston
People from Albany, Minnesota
1961 births
Living people